Sir William Herbert Herries  (19 April 1859 – 22 February 1923) was an English-born New Zealand politician.

Biography

Herries was born in London, the son of Herbert Crompton Herries, a barrister, and his wife, Leonora Emma Wickham. His grandfather was Henry Lewis Wickham, a Receiver General of Gibraltar. The English MP William Wickham was his uncle. From a wealthy middle-class family, he was educated at Eton College and Trinity College, Cambridge, where he studied natural sciences.

At the age of 22 he emigrated to New Zealand and became a farmer near Te Aroha, with a passion for racing and breeding horses. On 4 December 1889, he married his neighbour Catherine Louisa Roche; they remained without children.

Herries was elected to the House of Representatives for the Bay of Plenty electorate in 1896, holding the seat until 1908, when he was elected for Tauranga, which he held until his death. He became a member of the Reform Party, which formed in 1909.

The Herries travelled to England in 1912; they left on 21 March on the Iconic. The journey was a disaster, though. Just before they left, his mother died in New Zealand. His wife, who had been in indifferent health, died on the journey to England.

He was the Minister of Native Affairs from 1912 to February 1921, Minister of Railways from 1912 to 1919, Minister of Marine and Minister of Customs from 1919 to February 1921, and Minister of Labour from 1920 to February 1921 in the Reform Government.

Herries was appointed a Knight Commander of the Order of St Michael and St George (KCMG) in the 1920 New Year Honours. He died in Wellington on 22 February 1923.

Footnotes

References

 

|-

|-

1859 births
1923 deaths
Politicians from London
English emigrants to New Zealand
New Zealand farmers
Alumni of Trinity College, Cambridge
New Zealand Knights Commander of the Order of St Michael and St George
Members of the Cabinet of New Zealand
Reform Party (New Zealand) MPs
People educated at Eton College
People from the Bay of Plenty Region
Members of the New Zealand House of Representatives
New Zealand MPs for North Island electorates
19th-century New Zealand politicians
New Zealand politicians awarded knighthoods